Kobylík is a surname. Notable people with the surname include:

David Kobylík (born 1981), Czech footballer
Petr Kobylík (born 1985), Czech footballer

Czech-language surnames